Eupithecia exrubicunda is a moth in the family Geometridae. It is found in Taiwan.

References

Moths described in 1988
exrubicunda
Moths of Taiwan